Vicki Viidikas (25 September 1948 – 27 November 1998) was a twentieth-century Australian poet and prose writer.

Her first poem, At East Balmain, was published when she was 19 years old. Her poetry, fiction and drawings were published in literary magazines, as well as several collections of poetry. She wrote prolifically up until her untimely death at 50 years old, which was much mourned in Australia's poetry community.

Viidikas was an iconic member of the collection of Sydney poets now known as the “generation of ‘68”. The ‘counter culture’ and her travels in Asia, especially India, are recurrent subjects in her poetry.

Early life
Viidikas was born and grew up in Sydney, Australia. Her mother, Betty Kunig, was Anglo-Australian, her father Estonian. She had a sister, Ingrid Lisners, who has been involved with publishing the collection New and Rediscovered in tribute to her sister. Viidikas attended schools in Queensland and Sydney, until the age of 15 when she left education and her home.

After leaving home, she held various jobs, including veterinary assistant, typist, bartender, apple packer, bookshop assistant, and research assistant, before starting to write at 16 without any formal training.

Career
Alternative literary magazines began publishing Viidikas' poetry and fiction in the late 1960s and early 1970s. Her writing discussed the drug and sexual revolution taking place. She joined the Balmain New South Wales poetry scene in the late 1960s, she encountered, among others, Ken Bolton, John Forbes, Martin Johnston and John Tranter. Michael Wilding's recollections of her can be found in his 'Wild and Woolley: a publishing memoir' (Giramondo, 2011) and 'Growing Wild' (Arcadia, 2016).

Viidikas' work was influenced by her travels, including trips to Europe and the Middle East. She lived in India for over a decade in the 1970s and 1980s, with her experiences informing the collection India Ink published in 1984.

Works
Poetry
Condition Red. (University of Queensland, 1973) 
Knabel. (Sydney: Wild & Woolley, 1978) 
India Ink: A collection of prose poems written in India. (Sydney: Hale & Iremonger, 1984) 

Short stories
Wrappings. (Sydney : Wild & Woolley, 1974) 

Collected editions

 New and Rediscovered. (Transit Lounge, 2010) 

Viidikas' novel Kali and the Dung has not been published.

Influence
In 1975, Stephen Wallace directed a short film, Break Up, from the short story ‘Getting it all Together’ published in Wrappings.

Awards

 Australia Council Grants, Awards and Fellowships, Literature Board Grants, 1980
 Australia Council Grants, Awards and Fellowships, Literature Board Fellowship, 1978
 Australia Council Grants, Awards and Fellowships, Literature Board Fellowship, 1975
 Australia Council Grants, Awards and Fellowships, Literature Board Grants, Young Writers' Grant, 197

Personal life
During the late 1960s, Viidikas was briefly married to artist Robert (Bob) Finlayson. Whilst living in King's Cross, Balmain, they both became involved with the Poetry Society of Australia.

References

External links
Foreword Viidikas: Reintroduction of the ’68 Poet by Kerry Leves for Cordite Poetry Review (via Transit Lounge Publishing)
One day in the life of Vicki Viidikas by Stephen Oliver
Fuori le mura: Seven Vicki Viidikas Poems by Gig Ryan
Vicki Viidikas: Contents page at Australian Literature Resources (archived 2009)
Vicki's Voice - Remembering Vicki Viidikas by Australian Broadcasting Corporation

1948 births
1998 deaths
Writers from Sydney
Australian people of Estonian descent
Australian women poets
20th-century Australian women writers
20th-century Australian poets